The Kuwaiti–Rashidi war was a conflict between the Sheikhdom of Kuwait and the Emirate of Jabal Shammar which was fought from 1900 to 1901. It began in mid-december 1900, when the emir of Kuwait, Mubarak Al-Sabah launched a raid into central Arabia. It saw moderate initial success, with the Kuwaitis moving into Najd towards the end of February 1901, and having captured Unaizah, Buraidah and Al Zulfi by 11 March. Most of Riyadh was also captured (except for the besieged citadel), from where the Kuwaitis attempted to march on Ha'il, and on 11 March the Kuwaitis began a pursuit of the emir of Jabal Shammar, who was thought to be in the vicinity of Ha'il. Upon hearing of this defeat, Ibn Saud, who was besieging the Masmak fort in Riyadh (which was defended by Aljan ibn Muhammad), hastily retreated to Kuwait, and the emir of Kuwait followed suit, arriving in Kuwait on 31 March. The emir of Jabal Shammar, Abd al-Aziz ibn Mutib, attempted to follow up this victory by besieging Al Jahra, but retreated out of Kuwait after failing to capture Al Jahra for 2-3 weeks.

Battles 

 
 
Siege of Masmak fort
 Siege of Al Jahra

References 

Conflicts in 1900
Conflicts in 1901
Wars involving Kuwait
1900 in Kuwait
1901 in Kuwait